Canada–Yugoslavia relations were historical foreign relations between Canada and now split-up Socialist Federal Republic of Yugoslavia. Canada established formal bilateral relations with the Yugoslav government-in-exile on 9 February 1942 during World War II. Relations developed following the 1948 Tito–Stalin split when Canada started to perceive Yugoslavia as an entry point from which to challenge Soviet hegemony in Eastern Bloc countries. Relations were however cautious due to dissatisfaction of the Yugoslav side with the fact of right-wing nationalist and World War II revisionist Yugoslav Canadian emigration. In addition, while Canada was firmly entrenched with the Western Bloc, Yugoslavia promoted a policy of equidistance between superpowers and played a prominent role in development of the Non-Aligned Movement. Both Canada and Yugoslavia were among 51 original members of the United Nations.

History

Canada followed earlier decisions by the United States and United Kingdom and in December 1945 officially recognized the new Yugoslav communist government. Planning for a Canadian diplomatic mission in Yugoslavia began in late 1947, and once opened the mission in Belgrade was the second mission in the Balkans after the one in Athens, Greece. While Canada disagreed with Yugoslav official Marxist social framework the country still believed that Yugoslavia would respond favorably to Canadian initiatives in the United Nations where cooperation was developed. During the 1949 United Nations Security Council election Canada strongly advocated on behalf of Yugoslav candidacy.

See also
Yugoslavia–European Communities relations
Death and state funeral of Josip Broz Tito
Canada–Serbia relations
Canada–Slovenia relations
Yugoslav Canadians
Croatian Canadians
Serbian Canadians
Macedonian Canadians
Slovene Canadians
Bosnian Canadians
Montenegrin Canadians
Yugoslavia at the 1976 Summer Olympics
Canada at the 1984 Winter Olympics
Yugoslavia at the 1988 Winter Olympics

References

Canada–Yugoslavia relations
Canada
Yugoslavia
Bosnia and Herzegovina–Canada relations
Canada–Croatia relations
Canada–Kosovo relations
Canada–Montenegro relations
Canada–North Macedonia relations
Canada–Serbia relations
Canada–Slovenia relations